Gastrolepis is a genus of shrubs and trees in the family Stemonuraceae.  The genus is  endemic to New Caledonia in the Pacific and contains two species.

List of species

 Gastrolepis alticola 
 Gastrolepis austrocaledonica

References

Endemic flora of New Caledonia
Stemonuraceae
Asterid genera